Laurent Akran Mandjo (5 November 1940 – 25 August 2020) was an Ivorian Roman Catholic bishop. He served as Bishop of Yopougon from 1982 to 2015.

Biography
Mandjo was ordained a priest on 11 July 1971 by Monsignor Bernard Yago in the Diocese of Abidjan. He served as a vicar in Memni, then in Plateau. From 1978 to 1982, he studied Canon law at the Pontifical Urban University in Rome, where he obtained a doctoral degree. He defended a thesis titled L'éducation chrétienne des jeunes en Côte d'Ivoire à la lumière du magistère récent de l'Église.

The Diocese of Yopougon was created in 1982 and Mandjo was selected to be its first bishop by Pope John Paul II. He was consecrated on 18 September 1982 by Yago, assisted by Justo Mullor García and Bernard Agré. He became President of the Conférence des évêques catholiques de Côte d'Ivoire, serving from 2002 to 2008. He retired as Bishop of Yopougon in 2015.

Laurent Akran Mandjo died on 25 August 2020 in Abidjan at the age of 79.

References

1940 births
2020 deaths
People from Abidjan
20th-century Roman Catholic bishops in Ivory Coast
21st-century Roman Catholic bishops in Ivory Coast
Ivorian Roman Catholic bishops
Roman Catholic bishops of Yopougon